Glen Waters (born 3 May 1943) is an Australian former cricketer. He played three first-class matches for Tasmania between 1961 and 1962.

See also
 List of Tasmanian representative cricketers

References

External links
 

1943 births
Living people
Australian cricketers
Tasmania cricketers
Cricketers  from Launceston, Tasmania